John Joseph Finn (born September 30, 1952) is an American character actor known as one of the leads of the television programs Cold Case and EZ Streets. Finn has also had supporting roles in the films The Hunted (2003), Analyze That (2002), Catch Me If You Can (2002), True Crime (1999), Turbulence (1997), Blown Away (1994), The Pelican Brief (1993), and Glory (1989).

TV series that Finn has had recurring roles on include Dawson's Creek, The Practice, The X-Files, Strange World, NYPD Blue (he also appeared two other times on Blue as different characters), Chicago Hope, and eight episodes of Brooklyn South.

Early life 
Born to an Irish-American family in The Bronx, New York, he graduated from Eldred Central School in Eldred, New York, in the year 1970. He later joined the Navy for a few years, after which he entered the acting business.

Filmography

Film

Television

References

External links
 

1952 births
Living people
Male actors from New York City
American male film actors
American male television actors
American people of Irish descent
20th-century American male actors
21st-century American male actors